Huri Daraq (also Romanized as Ḩūrī Daraq) is a village in Dikleh Rural District, Hurand District, Ahar County, East Azerbaijan Province, Iran. At the 2006 census, its population was 487, in 115 families.

References 

Populated places in Ahar County